The 1912 Arkansas gubernatorial election took place on September 9, 1912.

Democratic Representative Joseph Taylor Robinson defeated the Republican and Socialist candidates Andrew I. Roland and G. E. Mikel with 64.74% of the vote.

Robinson would later leave his position after he was elected by the state legislature to fill the vacant Senate seat after Jefferson Davis died and would be succeeded by William Kavanaugh Oldham.

Results

References

1912 Arkansas elections
1912
Arkansas